Bitting may refer to:
 Bitting (key), the cuts made to a key
 the setup of a horse's bit
 in a nautical context, the fastening of a cable upon a bitt